Erik R. P. Zuiderweg (born February 28 or March 28, 1950) is an American biochemist, currently at University of Michigan and an Elected Fellow of the American Association for the Advancement of Science.

References

1950 births
Living people
Fellows of the American Association for the Advancement of Science
American biochemists
University of Michigan faculty